Ho Yi also known as Ho Yi Wong (黃浩義) (pinyin Huáng Hào Yì; born 1956) is a Chinese actor, theatre director, playwright and theatre producer of Hong Kong origin.  He has lived and worked in the United Kingdom.

Early life 
Ho Yi was born educated in Hong Kong.  His development as an actor/director coincided with the boom of the Hong Kong "City Hall Culture", a "renaissance" period of the former Urban Council, Hong Kong.

Professional early years 
Ho Yi's professional acting career began when the Hong Kong Repertory Theatre (香港話劇團), a government subsidized company prepared itself to establish in 1977, Ho Yi became one of its earliest freelance actors.  His first full-time acting job was with the government run Radio Television Hong Kong (香港電台) where he worked for three years.

Career in Hong Kong 
In 1983, Ho Yi founded Spotlight Productions (浩采製作) in Hong Kong and the Hong Kong Youth Theatre Company (香港青年劇團), mainly to do theatrical stage work. Between 1983 and 1997, with his two independent theatre companies, he wrote/translated, produced, directed and starred in a score of stage productions, including two musicals – of which his Pa Pa Can You Hear Me Sing (搭錯車) was with the collaboration of the late David Toguri (Rocky Horror Picture Show and Who Framed Roger Rabbit) as his choreographer. He also worked with the Hong Kong Philharmonic Orchestra in three seasons.

His signature play American Buffalo (勾心鬥角), first staged in 1986, became known as a theatrical milestone of Hong Kong as written up by "Film Bi-weekly" (電影雙周). Ho Yi's unique and original treatment in the delivery of the rich David Mamet dialogue in Cantonese (Cantonese is now officially recognised as a language) created a new form of acting style known as Wu Li Tou (無里頭) for the Hong Kong stage.

Ho Yi's career as a cross-genre actor, on both stage and screen, extended further afield in the early 1990s. As early as 1992, he produced, directed and acted in China. The following year he broke new grounds in Shanghai, by staging the American play Extremities (以牙還牙) in Mandarin.

He made his English-language acting debut in British television series Soldier, Soldier while still in Hong Kong, followed by a principal role in the film Victory (Wang) directed by Oscar-winner Mark Peploe (co-screenwriter of the Last Emperor), starring opposite Hollywood heavyweights Willem Dafoe and Sam Neill, in 1994.

Filmmaking in Hong Kong 
Ho Yi made his feature film directing debut with Thunderstorm (雷雨), for which he also wrote the screenplay and played the leading role, in 1995.

Red Passage ("紅色的迴廊")is Ho Yi's second narrative feature film as a director for which he wrote the screenplay in 2005. It took eight years before shooting began in July 2013. Red Passage is also produced by Ho Yi. It is based on his own story set in 1970/71 and filmed entirely in Hong Kong, in Cantonese. Red Passage had its world premiere at Palm Beach International Film Festival, on 6 April 2014. According to Tim Wassberg's review for Sirk TV of Inside Reel, the film "shows the intersection of both plot and emotion on a human scale [...] this movie from the perspective of the life of one who experienced it can be so compelling [...] It shows the conflict but also, within the character, his revelation."

On 13 September 2014, Red Passage was screened at the Awareness Film Festival in Los Angeles, where it won a Jury Award. On the same day, in the United States, Red Passage was also screened at the Reel Hope Film Festival in Indianapolis.  On 24 October 2014, Red Passage premiered in Hong Kong, at the Hong Kong Asian Film Festival.

In May 2015, Red Passage was selected by the Garifuna International Film Festival.  The film was awarded a "Best Foreign Language Film Award" as well as an appreciation certificate from the City of Los Angeles for "tremendous dedication to the preservation of indigenous culture bringing awareness through films" to Ho Yi personally.

United Kingdom works
After arriving in the United Kingdom, Ho Yi has appeared opposite Brad Pitt in Spy Game (Prison Warden) and Pierce Brosnan in the Bond movie Die Another Day (Mr. Chang). While residing in the United Kingdom, he also appeared in the TV series Thief Takers  and a feature film The Secret Laughter of Women with Colin Firth.

In May 2000, Ho Yi appeared, for an entire first run term, in a London's West End production of the Rodgers and Hammerstein musical The King & I, with Elaine Paige.  British critic Sheridan Morley reviewed in The Spectator and the British Teletext  describing Ho Yi as the "Male Star of the Night" for his opening night's performance of The Kralahome.

Works in Shanghai, China 
Upon arrival in Shanghai, he appeared in Chinese film Clay fear (陶器人形). For the stage, he directed An Inspector Calls (疑雲陣陣), A Doll's House ("玩偶之家"，又名 "傀儡家庭"), Agent Penny and A Woman's Monologue of the Classics (經典戲劇女獨白) in Shanghai.

Ho Yi was Dean (Professor) of the Academy of Performing Arts of the Shanghai Institute of Film Arts (上海電影藝術學院之演藝學院) for its first year (2004/2005). In summer 2009, Ho Yi published his 32-episode television screenplay Zhou Xinfang (周信芳傳奇之"戲子佳人")  in Hong Kong.

Personal life
Ho Yi is married to Vivian Chow (daughter of Peking opera actor Zhou Xinfang), with whom he has one son, Dashiell Edmund Wong.

Major acting credits

Theatre

Film

Television

Awards

References

External links
  
 
 互動百科---黃浩義 (Hudong)

Hong Kong male stage actors
Hong Kong male film actors
Hong Kong male television actors
1956 births
Living people
20th-century Hong Kong male actors
21st-century Hong Kong male actors